London broil, also known as the “Dawson” in parts of the Southern United States, is a beef dish made by broiling marinated beef, then cutting it across the grain into thin strips. Despite its name, the dish and the terminology are North American, not British.

Cut
"London broil" originally referred to broiled flank steak, although modern butchers may label top round, coulotte, or other cuts as "London broil", and the term has come to refer more to a method of preparation and cookery than to a specific cut of meat.

Preparation
The preparation of London broil typically involves marinating the meat for several hours followed by high heat searing in an oven broiler or outdoor grill.  It is then served in thin slices, cut across the grain.

In Canada
In parts of central Canada, a ground meat patty wrapped in flank or round steak is known as a London broil.  Some butchers will wrap the flank steak around a concoction of seasoned and ground or tenderized flank steak. Others sell a pork sausage patty wrapped in flank or top round steak labeled as London broil. Another variant, popular in Southern Ontario, is a London broil "loaf", wherein the tenderized flank steak exterior is wrapped around minced and spiced veal as the filler. In some regions, bacon will be added between the flank steak and the veal grind.

See also

 List of beef dishes
 List of steak dishes

References

Beef dishes
Canadian cuisine
American meat dishes